Hajji Nawab Hafiz Sir Hamidullah Khan  (9 September 1894 – 4 February 1960) was the last ruling Nawab of the princely salute state of Bhopal. He ruled from 1926 when his mother, Begum Kaikhusrau Jahan Begum, abdicated in his favor, until 1949 and held the honorific title until his death in 1960. A delegate to the Round Table Conference in London, he served as Chancellor of the Chamber of Princes from 1944–1947, when India became independent. 

During the Second World War, Nawab Hamidullah was present at the Battle of Keren and the Battle of El Alamein. He was very close to Muhammad Ali Jinnah and on very good terms with Louis Mountbatten, Viceroy and Governor General of India. Despite pressure from Jinnah, he reluctantly agreed to have Bhopal join the Union of India. He was succeeded by his second daughter, Sajida Sultan, Begum of Bhopal.

Personal life
 

Nawab Hamidullah Khan attended the Muhammadan Anglo-Oriental College (MAO College), now the Aligarh Muslim University, graduating in 1905 and Allahabad University, graduating with a BA in Law in 1915.

On 5 September 1925 at Peshawar, Nawab Hamidullah Khan married Maimoona Sultan Shah Banu Begum Sahiba (1900–1982), the great-great-granddaughter of Padshah Shuja Shah Durrani of Afghanistan. The couple had three daughters:
Suraya Jah, Nawab Gowhar-i-Taj, Abida Sultan Begum Sahiba
HH Sikander Saulat, Iftikhar ul-Mulk, Nawab Mehr-i-Taj Sajida Sultan Begum Sahiba, Nawab Begum of Dar ul-Iqbal-i-Bhopal
Nawabzadi Qamar-i-Taj Dulhan Rabia Sultan Begum Sahiba (1916–2001). Married twice and had one son and one daughter.

In 1947, he married Aftab Jahan Begum Sahiba (1919–2002), the daughter of a local Bhopali Muslim family. The couple had one daughter:
Farzana Begum Sahiba (1948)

He remained the Chancellor of Aligarh Muslim University from September 1930 to April 1935.

Titles

1894 - 1903: Nawabzada Muhammad Hamidu'llah Khan Bahadur
1903 - 1907: Hajji Nawabzada Muhammad Hamidu'llah Khan Bahadur
1907 - 1921: Hajji Nawabzada Hafiz Muhammad Hamidu'llah Khan Bahadur
1921 - 1922: Hajji Nawabzada Hafiz Muhammad Hamidu'llah Khan Bahadur, CSI
1922 - 1923: Hajji Nawabzada Hafiz Muhammad Hamidu'llah Khan Bahadur, CSI, CVO
1923 - 1926: Lieutenant Hajji Nawabzada Hafiz Muhammad Hamidu'llah Khan Bahadur, CSI, CVO
1926 - 1927: Lieutenant His Highness Sikander Saulat, Iftikhar ul-Mulk, Hajji Nawab Hafiz Muhammad Hamidu'llah Khan Bahadur, Nawab of Dar ul-Iqbal-i-Bhopal, CSI, CVO
1927 - 1929: Lieutenant-Colonel His Highness Sikander Saulat, Iftikhar ul-Mulk, Hajji Nawab Hafiz Sir Muhammad Hamidu'llah Khan Bahadur, Nawab of Dar ul-Iqbal-i-Bhopal, GCIE, CSI, CVO, KStJ
1929 - 1932: Lieutenant-Colonel His Highness Sikander Saulat, Iftikhar ul-Mulk, Hajji Nawab Hafiz Sir Muhammad Hamidu'llah Khan Bahadur, Nawab of Dar ul-Iqbal-i-Bhopal, GCIE, CSI, CVO, KStJ
1932 - 1939: Lieutenant-Colonel His Highness Sikander Saulat, Iftikhar ul-Mulk, Hajji Nawab Hafiz Sir Muhammad Hamidu'llah Khan Bahadur, Nawab of Dar ul-Iqbal-i-Bhopal, GCSI, GCIE, CVO, KStJ
1939 - 1943: Colonel His Highness Sikander Saulat, Iftikhar ul-Mulk, Hajji Nawab Hafiz Sir Muhammad Hamidu'llah Khan Bahadur, Nawab of Dar ul-Iqbal-i-Bhopal, GCSI, GCIE, CVO, KStJ
1943 - 1945: Air Commodore His Highness Sikander Saulat, Iftikhar ul-Mulk, Hajji Nawab Hafiz Sir Muhammad Hamidu'llah Khan Bahadur, Nawab of Dar ul-Iqbal-i-Bhopal, GCSI, GCIE, CVO, KStJ
1945 - 1946: Air Vice-Marshal His Highness Sikander Saulat, Iftikhar ul-Mulk, Hajji Nawab Hafiz Sir Muhammad Hamidu'llah Khan Bahadur, Nawab of Dar ul-Iqbal-i-Bhopal, GCSI, GCIE, CVO, KStJ
1946 - 1960: Major-General & Air Vice-Marshal His Highness Sikander Saulat, Iftikhar ul-Mulk, Hajji Nawab Hafiz Sir Muhammad Hamidu'llah Khan Bahadur, Nawab of Dar ul-Iqbal-i-Bhopal, GCSI, GCIE, CVO, KStJ

Honours

(ribbon bar, as it would look today; incomplete)

Delhi Durbar Gold Medal, 1903
Delhi Durbar Gold Medal, 1911
Prince of Wales Visit Medal, 1922
Commander of the Royal Victorian Order (CVO), 1922
Knight Grand Commander of the Order of the Indian Empire (GCIE), 1929
Knight Grand Commander of the Order of the Star of India (GCSI), 1932 (CSI - 1921)
Knight of the Order of St John (KStJ)
King George V Silver Jubilee Medal, 1935
King George VI Coronation Medal, 1937
1939-1945 Star, 1945
Africa Star, 1945
Burma Star, 1945
Defence Medal, 1945
India Service Medal, 1945
Indian Independence Medal, 1947
Queen Elizabeth II Coronation Medal, 1953

References

External links

 Genealogy of Bhopal Queensland University
  Muhammad Hamid-ullah Khan, Nawab of Bhopal (1894-1949)- 1900 childhood image British Library

1894 births
1960 deaths
Indian Muslims
Knights Grand Commander of the Order of the Star of India
Knights Grand Commander of the Order of the Indian Empire
Indian Commanders of the Royal Victorian Order
Knights of the Order of St John
Nawabs of Bhopal
Royal Air Force air marshals
Royal Air Force officers holding honorary commissions
Presidents of the Board of Control for Cricket in India
Knights of the Order of Saint John (chartered 1888)